All Out & Down is the third studio album collaboration by Chris Brokaw and Geoff Farina as a duo. The album was recorded by Matthew Brown at Crackle and Pop in Seattle, WA, in 2014, with additional recording and mixing by Geoff Farina at Hev-e-Kreem, Chicago, IL, and was mastered for vinyl by Neil Strauch. It was released on Landland ≠ Record Label in the US on June 10, 2016.

The album is a collection of blues and folk covers and it differs from the duo's previous release in that it includes no original compositions. The album's songs include Mick Jagger and Keith Richard's No Expectations, from The Rolling Stones' 1968 album Beggars Banquet, Jeffrey Lee Pierce's Mother of Earth, originally recorded by The Gun Club for their 1982 album Miami, as well as a number of pre-WWII North American folk, Delta blues, and ragtime classics by the likes of Woody Guthrie, Harold Dixon, Alvin Pleasant Delaney "A.P." Carter, and William "Hambone Willie" Newbern.

All Out & Down is Brokaw's first album since 2015's The Periscope Twins and Farina's first since Exit Verse's 2016 album Grant No Glory.

Track listing

Personnel 
 Chris Brokaw – vocals, guitar
 Geoff Farina – vocals, guitar, additional production and  mixing
 Production: Matthew Brown – production
 Neil Strauch – mastering
 Dan Black – photography, design

References

External links 
 Chris Brokaw official site
 Geoff Farina official site
 Landland Website

2016 albums
Covers albums
Chris Brokaw albums